} is a train station in Uminokuchi in the village of Minamimaki, Minamisaku District, Nagano Prefecture, Japan, operated by East Japan Railway Company (JR East).

Lines
Umijiri Station is served by the Koumi Line and is 42.1 kilometers from the terminus of the line at Kobuchizawa Station.

Station layout
The station consists of one ground-level side platform serving a single bi-directional track. The station is unattended.

History
Umijiri Station opened on 27 December 1932.  With the privatization of Japanese National Railways (JNR) on 1 April 1987, the station came under the control of JR East.

Surrounding area
Chikuma River

See also
 List of railway stations in Japan

References

External links

 JR East station information 

Railway stations in Nagano Prefecture
Railway stations in Japan opened in 1932
Stations of East Japan Railway Company
Koumi Line
Minamimaki, Nagano